Robert Jud was an Italian luger who competed in the mid-1970s. A natural track luger, he and Erich Graber won three medals in the men's doubles event at the FIL European Luge Natural Track Championships with two golds (1975, 1977) and one silver (1974).

References
Natural track European Championships results 1970-2010.

Italian male lugers
Italian lugers
Year of birth missing
Possibly living people
Sportspeople from Südtirol